Žiar nad Hronom District is a district in the Banská Bystrica Region of central Slovakia. Until 1918, the district was part of the county of Tekov.

Municipalities 

The names in bold represent towns.

Bartošova Lehôtka
Bzenica
Dolná Trnávka
Dolná Ves
Dolná Ždaňa
Hliník nad Hronom
Horná Ves
Horná Ždaňa
Hronská Dúbrava
Ihráč
Janova Lehota
Jastrabá
Kopernica
Kosorín
Krahule
Kremnica
Kremnické Bane
Kunešov
Ladomeská Vieska
Lehôtka pod Brehmi
Lovča
Lovčica-Trubín
Lúčky
Lutila
Nevoľné
Pitelová
Prestavlky
Prochot
Repište
Sklené Teplice
Slaská
Stará Kremnička
Trnavá Hora
Vyhne
Žiar nad Hronom

 
Districts of Slovakia